Elanora may refer to:

 Elanora Heights, New South Wales - a suburb of Sydney
 Elanora, Queensland - a suburb of the Gold Coast

See also 
 Eleanora, a female given name